Beth Chamberlin (born October 1, 1963) is an American actress, known for her role as Beth Raines on the CBS soap opera, Guiding Light.

Early life
Chamberlin was born in Danville, Vermont. She studied ballet with the American Ballet Theatre before enrolling at New York University as a dance/theater major. Chamberlin has a number of regional theater credits, include The Taming of the Shrew, Godspell, Flowers for Algernon and You Can't Take It with You.

Career
Chamberlin is best known for her portrayal of Beth Raines Spaulding LeMay Winslow Spaulding Bauer Spaulding on the CBS daytime soap opera Guiding Light. She was the second actress to portray the role and initially portrayed Beth for a two-year stint from 1989 to 1991. She returned to the role in November 1997 full-time and remained with the show until its cancellation in 2009. She also played the role of Lorelei Hills, Beth's dissociative identity disorder personality, from 2001 to 2002. She was nominated for the 2010 Daytime Emmy Award for Outstanding Supporting Actress in a Drama Series for her portrayal as Beth Raines on the final season of Guiding Light. Additionally, Chamberlin was nominated two other times for Soap Opera Digest Awards, once in 1991 for  Outstanding Super Couple and again in 1998 for Outstanding Villainess.

On primetime television, Chamberlin guest starred on Columbo, Silk Stalkings, Cashmere Mafia, Law & Order: Special Victims Unit, Blue Bloods, and Chicago Med. She co-starred in two television pilots; Murder in Manhattan for ABC in 2013, and Untitled Wall Street Project for CBS in 2014. In 2022, she was cast as a series regular in the third season of the crime drama series La Reina del Sur playing Jane Kosar.

Personal life
Chamberlin has been married to Dr. Peter Roy since 1994.

In March 2008, Chamberlin released "The Kettlebell Way To Your Perfect Body" and launched a health and fitness website. She released her second kettlebell DVD,  "The Kettlebell Way, Volume 2 - Empire State"  in the November, 2008.  Chamberlin is a certified kettlebell trainer and a member of National Strength and Conditioning Association.

Filmography

References

External links
 
 Beth Chamberlin beauty, health and fitness site

1963 births
Living people
American soap opera actresses
People from Danville, Vermont
Actresses from Vermont
20th-century American actresses
21st-century American actresses